Quzaḥ is a pre-Islamic Arab god of weather, worshiped by the people of Muzdalifah. The pre-Islamic rite of the Ifada celebrated after the September equinox was performed facing the direction of Quzah's sanctuary. A lasting reference to Quzah is the term qaws Quzaḥ, "Bow of Quzah", which became the Arabic term for rainbow.

References

Arabian gods
Sky and weather gods
Rainbows in culture